The Ghost Album is the sixth album by Wyrd, released in 2006 by Omvina Records.

Track listing

Credits
Narqath – vocals, guitars and bass.
JL Nokturnal - drums.

References

Wyrd (band) albums
2006 albums